The Biga River is a small river in Çanakkale Province in northwestern Turkey. The river begins at the base of Mount Ida and trends generally northeasterly to the Sea of Marmara. It flows past the towns of Çan and Biga and enters the Sea of Marmara at Karabiga. It is also known as the Çan (Çan Çayı) and the Kocabaş (Kocabaş Çayı).

The Biga was the classical Granicus (Granikòs Potamós).

The banks near the modern-day town of Biga were the site of the Battle of the Granicus, fought in 334 BC between the Macedonian army of Alexander the Great and the forces of the Persian Empire of Darius III. This was Alexander's first victory over the Persians. In antiquity, the river was described as having strong, turbulent current, with steep banks and varying depth.

There is also a valley named in its honor on Mars.

Notes

References

External links
 Livius.org: Granicus - pictures of the stream
 A map showing the River Biga

Rivers of Turkey
Landforms of Çanakkale Province